del Monte is a surname. Notable people with the name include:

Antonio Maria Ciocchi del Monte (died 1533), Italian bishop and cardinal
Bryan Del Monte,  U.S. Department of Defense deputy director
Deodat del Monte (1582–1624), Flemish painter, architect, engineer, astronomer
Domingo del Monte (1804–1853), Cuban writer
Fabrizio del Monte (born 1980), Italian racing driver
Francesco Maria del Monte (1549–1627),  Italian cardinal
Guidobaldo del Monte (1545–1607), Italian mathematician, philosopher and astronomer
Ishmael Del'Monte, Bridge player
Innocenzo Ciocchi Del Monte (c. 1532–1577), Italian cardinal
María del Monte (born 1962), Spanish singer and TV and radio hostess
Pietro del Monte (c. 1400 – 1457) Italian jurist, canonist and humanist
Peter Del Monte (1943–2021), Italian film director and screenwriter
Ryan Del Monte (born 1983), Canadian ice hockey player
Virginia Bourbon del Monte (1899–1945), Italian princess

See also
Delmonte, surname
Delmont (surname)